Iolaus belli is a butterfly in the family Lycaenidae. The species was described from Sherbro Island in Sierra Leone. The current status of the species is unknown

References

External links

Die Gross-Schmetterlinge der Erde 13: Die Afrikanischen Tagfalter. Plate XIII 68 g

Butterflies described in 1869
Iolaus (butterfly)
Endemic fauna of Sierra Leone
Butterflies of Africa
Taxa named by William Chapman Hewitson